Sindora beccariana is a species of plant in the family Fabaceae. It is a tree found in Borneo. It is threatened by habitat loss.

References

beccariana
Data deficient plants
Trees of Borneo
Taxonomy articles created by Polbot